Baghlani Jadid, (surface: 1,613 km2) is a district of Baghlan Province in northern Afghanistan. It has a population of about 119,607.

Geography
The district is situated in the northernmost part of the province. It borders Kunduz Province to the north and Samangan Province to the west .  Most of the population live in the valley of the Kunduz River. The majority of its territory is uninhabited mountain ranges. An all-weather Kunduz-Kabul highway passes through the district from north to south. The main city is Baghlani Jadid. In 2005, Baghlani Jadid absorbed the district of Baghlan-e-Markazi, also in Baghlan Province, to create a new and bigger Baghlani Jadid district.

Demographics
According to Afghanistan's Ministry of Rural Rehabilitation and Development, the population of the district was estimated to be around 119,607 in 2004. Ethnically, Pashtuns are around 50% of the population and make up the majority in the district, followed by Tajiks at 40%  and Uzbeks make up the remaining 10%.

References

External links 
 Map of Settlements United Nations, AIMS, May 2002

Districts of Baghlan Province